Three in Exile is a 1925 American silent Western film directed by Fred Windemere and starring Louise Lorraine, Art Acord, and Tom London.

Plot
As described in a film magazine review, a dog that is chased by a mob, a man named Art who runs from an enemy he believes he has killed, and a horse that escapes his brutal owners meet on the desert edge. They search for water and in the search meet Lorraine, a young woman whose enemies are attempting to steal her mine. Together the man and woman and their four-footed animal friends defeat the would-be thieves. The couple are then married.

Cast
 Louise Lorraine as Lorraine Estes 
 Art Acord as Art Flanders 
 Tom London as Jed Hawkings 
 Rex the Dog as Rex, Art's Dog 
 Black Beauty as Black Beauty, a Horse

References

Bibliography
 Munden, Kenneth White. The American Film Institute Catalog of Motion Pictures Produced in the United States, Part 1. University of California Press, 1997.

External links

 

1925 films
1925 Western (genre) films
Films directed by Fred Windemere
American black-and-white films
Silent American Western (genre) films
1920s English-language films
1920s American films